Hum Hain Kamaal Ke (Hindi: हम हैं कमाल के) is a Bollywood action & comedy film released on 21 September 1993. The film had a multi star cast; Sheeba Akashdeep, Kader Khan, Anupam Kher, Aruna Irani, Raza Murad, Sadashiv Amrapurkar, Sujoy Mukherjee and Rucha Gujarathi. This movie was produced by Ashok Adnani, directed by Vijay Reddy and story was written by Anwar Khan.
The film is loosely based on the 1989 American film See No Evil, Hear No Evil which was also the inspiration for Marathi movie Eka Peksha Ek, Tamil movie Andipatti Arasampatti and Kannada movies Akka Pakka and Baduku Jataka Bandi.

Plot
The film revolves around two physically challenged friends; Nilamber (Kader Khan) and Pitamber (Anupam Kher). Nilambar is deaf and Pitamber is blind since birth. Both friends developed special skills and also good coordination between themselves, due to which others fail to realize that they are differently abled. Jebago (Raza Murad) is head of some gangsters. Nilambar and Pitamber attempt to solve a murder mystery with series of comic mishaps.

Cast
Sheeba as Shalu
Kader Khan as Peetambar
Anupam Kher as Neelambar
Aruna Irani as Lado Ghodpade
Raza Murad as Zibago
Sadashiv Amrapurkar as Inspector Ghodpade
Rakesh Bedi as Police Constable Heera
Sameer Khakhar as Police Constable Panna
Sujoy Mukherjee as Vishal 
Dilip Dhawan as Manish
Seema Deo as Vishal Mother
Mahesh Anand as Danny
Amita Nangia as Kunika
Tiku Talsania as Rickshawala
Anjan Srivastav as Police Commissioner 
Yunus Parvez as Doctor
Bob Christo as Diamond exchanger
 Rucha Gujarathi as Baby Rucha

Songs
All songs are written by Rani Malik. Soundtrack is available on Tips Music.
"Agar Tum Hum Se" - Alka Yagnik, S. P. Balasubrahmanyam
"Bas Yehi Jee Chahta hai" - Alka Yagnik, Kumar Sanu
"Kaise Mujhe Chhua Yeh Batao Na" - Alisha Chinoy
"Kitne Haseen Kitne Jawan" - Alka Yagnik
"Kitne Haseen Kitne Jawan v2" - S. P. Balasubrahmanyam
"Mere Paas Bachi Nahi Kaudi" - Sudesh Bhosale, Falguni Sheth
"Nazaron Ka Kya Kasoor Hai" - Alka Yagnik, S. P. Balasubrahmanyam
"Sun Sun Re Sajan" - Alka Yagnik, S. P. Balasubrahmanyam

See also

 Cinema of India
 Bollywood

References

External links
 

1990s Hindi-language films
1990s thriller films
Indian remakes of American films
Indian comedy thriller films